Rashad Ahmadov (born January 5, 1981, in Yevlakh) is an Azerbaijani taekwondo practitioner. He is a four-time medalist at the European Taekwondo Championships, and a two-time bronze medalist for the welterweight division at the World Taekwondo Championships (2003 in Garmisch-Partenkirchen, Germany and 2009 in Copenhagen, Denmark).

Ahmadov made his official debut for the 2004 Summer Olympics in Athens, where he competed in the men's welterweight category (80 kg). He defeated Trinidad and Tobago's Chinedum Osuji and France's Christophe Negrel in the first two rounds, before losing out the semi-final match by a superiority decision to Turkey's Bahri Tanrıkulu. Ahmadov was eventually beaten by Iran's Youssef Karami in a close match for the bronze medal, with the final score of 8–9. Following his sudden defeat, the Azerbaijani team stormed the fighting area, and launched a resentful protest at Olympic officials.

At the 2008 Summer Olympics in Beijing, Ahmadov qualified for the second time in the men's 80 kg class after placing second from the European Qualification Tournament in Istanbul, Turkey. Ahmadov defeated Qatar's Abdulqader Hikmat Sarhan in the preliminary round and Canada's Sébastien Michaud by a superiority decision in the quarterfinals. He repeated his fate in the semi-final match from the previous games, when he lost to former heavyweight champion Hadi Saei of Iran, with a score of 1–4. Ahmadov automatically qualified for the bronze medal bout, where he was defeated in a tight match against American taekwondo jin and two-time defending champion Steven López, with a final score of 2–3.

References

External links

NBC 2008 Olympics profile

Azerbaijani male taekwondo practitioners
1981 births
Living people
Olympic taekwondo practitioners of Azerbaijan
Taekwondo practitioners at the 2004 Summer Olympics
Taekwondo practitioners at the 2008 Summer Olympics
European Taekwondo Championships medalists
World Taekwondo Championships medalists
20th-century Azerbaijani people
21st-century Azerbaijani people